All in All Azhagu Raja is a 2013 Indian Tamil-language romantic comedy film written and directed by M. Rajesh. Karthi in dual lead roles with, Kajal Aggarwal and Santhanam in the supporting roles. It marks the second collaboration between Karthi and Kajal Aggarwal after, 2010 film, Naan Mahaan Alla.

The film was released on 2 November 2013 Coinciding with Diwali festival to a negative reception from critics.

Plot
Azhagu Raja, is the only son of the Muthukrishnan family. He owns an unpopular cable channel called "Triple A" in Tenkasi. The cable company has only two employees, Raja and Kalyanam. Nothing they do improves the company's fortunes. By chance, Raja meets Chitra Devi Priya when she is singing at a wedding. Her unusual voice irritates him, and they argue. However, Priya eventually agrees that she cannot sing well. Priya says she fails at everything she tries, even suicide. As their friendship blossoms, Raja tells his father Muthukrishnan, about Priya which triggers a memory in Muthukrishnan about his past.

Muthukrishnan used to work for Burma Ramaswamy after being recommended by Kali. Meenakshi his daughter, falls for him. Seeing his hard work and dedication, Ramaswamy promotes him to more responsible work in the theater and appoints Kali under him. Meena asks for an answer in two days. But an enraged Kali, filled with jealousy, plots to pit Ramaswamy against Muthukrishnan and is successful when Muthukrishnan is ousted by Ramaswamy due to a misunderstanding.

Raja steps into Muthukrishnan's 1980s world. Muthukrishnan and Priya's father Kandhaswamy reject Raja's marriage to Priya. Muthukrishnan and Kandhaswamy meet and realize that jealousy of Kali, Kalyanam's father, was the reason for the problems of the families; finally Kalyanam tells the real story & both families unite to marry Raja and Priya.

Cast

 Karthi in a dual role as Azhagu Raja and Young Muthukrishnan
 Prabhu as Muthukrishnan, Raja's father
 Kajal Aggarwal as "Chitra" Devi Priya, Azhagu Raja's love interest and later wife.
 Santhanam as double role Kalyanam (Kareena Chopra), Azhagu Raja's best friend and Kaali, Kalyanam's father and Muthukrishnan's friend
 Saranya Ponvannan as Meenakshi Muthukrishnan, wife of Muthukrishnan & Raja's mother
 Radhika Apte as Meenakshi Raamasamy, Muthukrishnan's love interest (voice dubbed by Savitha Reddy)
 Nassar as Burma Raamasamy, father of Kanthasamy and Meenakshi
 Aadukalam Naren as Kanthasamy (Kuttil Star)
 Sriranjini as Kanthasamy's wife
 Kota Srinivasa Rao as Chokkanathan
 M. S. Bhaskar as Dhillaana Dhivyanathan
 Santhana Bharathi as Khader Bhai
 V. S. Raghavan as Sathyamoorthy
 Subbu Panchu as Doctor
 Ayub Khan in Guest Role

Production
Rajesh first announced a project with Karthi called Kaagitha Kappal but it did not proceed and Rajesh went on to Oru Kal Oru Kannadi. In 2012, Rajesh announced All in All Azhaguraja. He named the new project with Karthi after a character played by Goundamani in the film Vaidehi Kaathirundhal. Rajesh's usual comedian Santhanam would provide the comic relief. Kajal Aggarwal who worked with Karthi in Naan Mahaan Alla was selected as the heroine. Prabhu joined the cast. Initially, Narain denied being a part of the film project. Yuvan Shankar Raja was reported to compose the film's soundtrack, but was replaced by S. Thaman. Filming took place on 2 March 2013. The film was shot in Kumbakonam, Pollachi, Gobichettipalayam, Tenkasi, Ambasamuthiram and other places of Tamil Nadu.

Soundtrack

The soundtrack for the film was composed by S. Thaman, in his first collaboration with M. Rajesh and Karthi. The audio rights were secured by Sony Music. The audio was expected to release at an event on 28 September 2013, however the audio was released on 10 October 2013, at Sathyam Cinemas in Chennai. The album features five tracks, with one of the songs "Chellam" (Yaarukkum Sollama) was released on 4 October 2013, at the Radio Mirchi FM Station. Behindwoods called the soundtrack "Simple and enjoyable" and gave 2.75 out of 5 to the album. Milliblog reviewed it as a short, lively and fun soundtrack.

Marketing and release 

The satellite rights of the film were sold to Sun TV. The film's first look was released on 6 September 2013. The teaser was expected to be released on the same day, however it was released on 7 September 2013. The theatrical trailer was released on 10 October 2013. The film was released on 2 November 2013, coinciding with Diwali, along with Arrambam and Pandiya Naadu.

Reception

Critical response

All in All Azhagu Raja received negative reviews from critics, with some speaking positively of the performances from Karthi and Santhanam. Baradwaj Rangan wrote, "What a wretched, bloated, unfunny mess this is, with the ugliest segues between comedy and melodrama in recent memory. Scenes go on and on with no point, and as a result, the film goes on and on pointlessly." Rediff.com gave it 1.5 stars out of 5 and wrote, "All in All Azhagu Raja is an absolutely ridiculous and tortuously long roemantic comedy film that seriously tests your patience." Sify wrote, "All in All Azhaguraja falls flat on its face... it is an ordeal to sit through this profoundly irritating film...it lacks basic storyline and took the audiences for granted. The film has no real script to speak of, at best a skeletal plot and in its final verdict termed the film as a "Big Bore". Prakash Upadhyaya of OneIndia called it "A comedy story presented in a boring way." Behindwoods said, "All in All Azhaguraja lacks the Rajesh - Santhanam magic" and rated it 2.25 out of 5. Indiaglitz said that while Rajesh has a history for being able "to milk humor out of a thin storyline without much trouble," he failed to do so in this film.

References

External links
 

Indian romantic comedy films
2013 romantic comedy films
Films shot in Ooty
2013 films
2010s Tamil-language films
Films scored by Thaman S
Cross-dressing in Indian films
Films set in 2013
Films set in the 1980s
Films directed by M. Rajesh